is a Japanese retired track and field hurdler who specialized in the 400 metres hurdles. She won a gold medal at the 2009 East Asian Games, finished seventh at the 2010 Asian Games and finished fourth at the 2011 Asian Championships.

Personal bests

International competition

References

External links

Miyabi Tago at JAAF 

1988 births
Living people
Japanese female hurdlers
Sportspeople from Saitama Prefecture
Athletes (track and field) at the 2010 Asian Games
Asian Games competitors for Japan
21st-century Japanese women